The State Railways Institution is a state-run organization of Venezuela that manages the railway systems of the country. Its headquarters are located in Caracas, Venezuela.

According to the 1999 Constitution, its renovation is a national priority. The new infrastructure which has been added includes the first new above-ground train line constructed in Venezuela for more than 70 years, the Ezequiel Zamora Mass Transportation System. Named after the soldier Ezequiel Zamora, it was inaugurated on October 15, 2006, by President Hugo Chávez.

History

Historically, much of the original Venezuelan network was designed in the 19th century in the Federalist period and under the administration of Antonio Guzmán Blanco, in order to open up the country for trade and earn foreign revenues. However, the first licenses were signed and revoked nine times before the first stretch was operating.

Two of the first lines connected Caracas to its port of La Guaira (the La Guaira and Caracas Railway) and to Valencia (the Great Venezuela Railway) in the 1880s. 
Notable engineers associated with its original development include: John Grover and Robert Fairlie. Some of the later lines were designed by William A. Welch and Thomas Kavanagh (Caracas subway).

Rail transport in Venezuela was neglected and went into a major decline from the 1950s, with bus and road transport taking its place, just Caracas maintaining its  of subway system and local railway.

In 1975 was devised by the "Instituto Ferrocarriles del Estado" (IFE) a National Plan Ferrocarrilero that began in Maracaibo and reached Barquisimeto-Puerto Cabello-Valencia-Caracas-Cua, following from Cua to Barcelona and Ciudad Bolivar-Ciudad Guayana. The company "Saprolate-Tranarg" made all aerial photographic surveys and the Plan was approved by the then President Luis Herrera Campins, but in the 1980s the Plan IFE was blocked for economic reasons after the devaluation of the Bolivar in 1983 and then was finally canceled with the Caracazo of 1989. Only the section Caracas-Cua was maintained as a budgeted project (and was made, being inaugurated in 2006 by President Hugo Chavez) .

The 1999 constitution was a signal for a major reinvestment in the infrastructure of the state. Much of the renovation of the current Venezuelan railway network is still at the planning stage, with some already constructed and the rest to be built over a period of about 30 years.

Railway network 

The Venezuelan network includes  of rail in standard gauge. The network covers the populated and production areas in the country, and is managed by IFE under various Regional Development Plans. There are also connections between Colombia and Brazil that link to the other countries of South America, although traffic in the border areas are affected by foreign policy and defence strategy.

IFE is the sole operator of trains in Venezuela, however, they have created various railway names assigned to different regions throughout the country.

Operational

Fully Updated

Caracas – Cúa branch

After 70 years without major improvements to the Venezuelan railway system, the Caracas – Cúa line was opened for public service on October 15, 2006.
The route is part of the projected Ezequiel Zamora railway axis. It starts from Caracas and ends in Cúa, Miranda State. The main terminal is located next to the Caracas Metro (subway) line 3 La Rinconada Terminal Station. This short North-South line can be passenger travelled in approximately, 30 minutes. 
The following are the names of the 4 stations and the estimated travel time from Caracas and then the additional time to the next station. Also there is a delay time before the train restarts the trip which can be adjusted by management policy.

Modernization/reconstruction

Puerto Cabello – Yaritagua – Barquisimeto branch

This line connects Carabobo State, Yaracuy State and Lara State. The stations are as follows:
 Puerto Cabello, Carabobo State;
 Morón, Carabobo State;
 San Felipe, Yaracuy State;
 Urama, Yaracuy State;
 Chivacoa, Yaracuy State;
 Yaritagua, Yaracuy State and;
 Barquisimeto, Lara State.

Yaritagua – Acarigua branch

San Juan de los Morros – San Fernando de Apure branch

This line was supposed to connect Guárico State and Apure State.

Services

The railway provides both freight and passenger service.

Freight

Between Puerto Cabello and Barquisimeto movement of loads over 3 million tons per month have been exceeded.

Passenger

 passenger service is provided only between the stations on the Caracas – Cúa Branch. The following table shows the train schedule:

There is no Sunday service and all times are subject to change depending on special events, system improvements and the decisions the managers may make.

Construction

Work in progress

Puerto Cabello – La Encrucijada branch

Another part of the Ezequiel Zamora railway axis has  under construction  between the sea port city of Puerto Cabello, Carabobo State, and the crossroads town of La Encrucijada, Aragua State. The line is predominately east–west, although between the station at Naguanagua and the terminus at Puerto Cabello the route changes to a north–south direction.

14 tunnels including the  Bárbula Tunnel (the longest in South America) and many bridges are required to connect between the various stations along this line. 
The project is behind schedule. In 2016 work on the Puerto Cabello railway was described as "irregular and marked by slow payments by the client as a result of the country’s poor economic conditions, mainly related to the drop in the price of oil."

The new stations under construction are found in:
 La Encrucijada, Aragua State; the hub in La Encrucijada will provide easy access to the users from Cagua, Aragua State.
 Maracay, Aragua State;
 Mariara, Carabobo State;
 San Joaquín, Carabobo State
 San Diego, Carabobo State*
 Naguanagua, Carabobo State*
 Puerto Cabello, Carabobo State

(*)These 2 are suburban cities of Valencia.

Chaguaramas – Las Mercedes – Cabruta – Caicara del Orinoco branch

Another branch north–south line  found mainly in Guarico State that will cross the Orinoco River and enter the Bolívar State.

Maracaibo – Sabana de Mendoza branch

This  will start in the capital city of Maracaibo Zulia State nearby the Maracaibo Metro (subway) station. The line will cross the mouth of Lake Maracaibo in a combination tunnel/bridge under construction in an east–west direction and after the El Tablazo stop the line follows a north-north-west to south-south-east direction. The stations are as follows:

 Maracaibo, Zulia State;
 El Tablazo, Zulia State;
 Santa Rita State;
 Cabimas, Zulia State;
 Ciudad Ojeda, Zulia State;
 Lagunillas, Zulia State;
 Bachaquero, Zulia State;
 Mene Grande, Zulia State;
 Sabana de Mendoza, Trujillo State.

Puerto Ordaz – Maturín – Manicuare branch
This  route will start from Ciudad Guyana Bolívar State, the Puerto Ordaz section and cross the Orinoco River to go south–north to reach Maturín, Monagas State and continue till it reaches the Sucre State where the line will run east–west until it reaches the deep sea water port of Manicuare.

Acarigua – Turén branch

Tinaco – Anaco branch

The first phase  is part of the North Llanero railway axis (northern plains) an east–west line that would provide service to the following cities/towns:

 Anaco, Anzoátegui State;
 Aragua de Barcelona, Anzoátegui State;
 Zaraza, Guárico State;
 Tucupito, Guárico State
 Valle de la Pascua, Guárico State;
 Chaguaramos, Guárico State
 El Sombrero, Guárico State;
 Dos Caminos, Guárico State;
 El Pao, Cojedes;
 Tinaco, Cojedes State,

and work was to be completed by 2012.

As part of a National Rail Development Plan, the standard gauge Tinaco-Anaco railway, was inaugurated with Chinese funding in 2009.

About a fifth of the work had been done by 2012. However, it appears construction stalled in 2013, though the route remains on the State Railways Institution's map of railways under construction .

Parque Recreacional - El Encanto branch

This 7 km long branch independent of all other rail systems is for recreational purposes only. Mainly is to provide entertainment for tourists, these enchanted sights must be viewed by all. Originally this summit section was part of the Great Venezuela Railway (180 km in length) built in 1909 and operated until after 1937. If all goes well this will be available to the public in 2012.

Planning/design stage

La Encrucijada – Cúa branch

The completion of the connection from La Encrucijada to the Tuy Valley will be made at a later date.

Sabana de Mendoza – Barquisimeto branch
A follow-up future east–west phase will connect Sabana de Mendoza with Barquisimeto Lara State.

San Juan de Los Morros – La Encrucijada branch

Future expansion includes a north–south connection between San Juan de Los Morros and La Encrucijada Station.

Anaco – Maturín branch

A separate phase for the North Llanero railway axis to be constructed at a later date will connect in an east–west direction Maturín Monagas State with Anaco Anzoátegui State.

Tinaco – San Cristóbal branch

The full  route, the North Llanero railway axis will be completed at a later date and will add services among the additional following cities:

 San Carlos, Cojedes State;
 Acarigua, Portuguesa State;
 Guanare, Portuguesa State;
 Sabaneta, Barinas State;
 Barinas, Barinas State;
 Barinitas, Barinas State;
 San Rafael del Piñal, Táchira State;
 San Cristóbal, Táchira State.

Caicara – Puerto Ayacucho branch

This north–south branch will connect Bolívar State to Amazonas State although a possible alternative would be to join San Fernando de Apure to Puerto Ayacucho.

San Fernando de Apure – Ciudad Bolívar – Ciudad Guayana – Tucupita branch 

This east–west route will connect Apure State, Guarico State, Bolivar State, Anzoategui State, Monagas State and Delta Amacuro State. Also this line will have stops in Cabruta and Caicara.

Caracas – La Guaira branch

This dominately north–south route  joining Federal District to Vargas State will provide access to and from Caracas and its International/National Airports and one of its major Seaports.

 Caracas (La Rinconada)
 Maiquetía Airport
 La Guaira Seaport

completion of this line is expected within 5 years after fund approval.

There are no rail links to adjacent countries.

See also 
 Transport in Venezuela

References

External links 
 IFE Website 

Railway companies of Venezuela
Standard gauge railways in Venezuela
Articles containing video clips
Venezuelan brands